The Austria Press Agency (APA) is the national news agency and the leading information provider in Austria. It is owned by Austrian newspapers and the national broadcaster ORF.

See also
Austria Nachrichtensender
Telegraphen-Korrespondenz Bureau

References

External links 
 APA Group 

1849 establishments in the Austrian Empire
News agencies based in Austria